This is a list of the highest-grossing mobile games. This is a list of mobile games that have generated at least $100 million in gross revenue. The video game company with the highest number of titles on the list is Tencent, which publishes and/or owns 12 games on the list, including three in the top ten. Five other Tencent titles on the list are also from their subsidiary Supercell.

The highest-grossing mobile app before that was Puzzle & Dragons (2012), a role-playing puzzle video game from GungHo Online Entertainment that had earned  up until October 2018, when it was surpassed by Monster Strike. In 2020, Honor of Kings surpassed Monster Strike as the highest-grossing mobile game.

List

See also
 Gacha game
 List of best-selling video game franchises
 List of best-selling video games
 List of highest-grossing media franchises
 List of most-played mobile games by player count
 List of most-played video games by player count

Notes

References

 
Mobile games